20/20 is a New Zealand documentary television programme hosted by Carolyn Robinson, and based on the American Broadcasting Company programme of the same name.

Between 1993 and 2014, the show contained a mix of locally produced and American content. The show now presents stories largely produced by its American counterpart, with a local presenter providing context at the beginning. The show uses the same graphics and theme music as the American version.

From 1993 until 2003, the show was broadcast on Three, and was hosted by Louise Wallace. The format was then picked up by TVNZ, and was hosted on TVNZ 2 first by Miriama Kamo until 2011, then by Sonya Wilson until 2014. In its latest iteration, the show is presented by Carolyn Robinson, and has been broadcast on TVNZ 1 since 2016. Producer Susie Nordqvist is the show's back-up presenter.

References

1993 New Zealand television series debuts
2003 New Zealand television series endings
2005 New Zealand television series debuts
2014 New Zealand television series endings
2016 New Zealand television series debuts
1990s New Zealand television series
2000s New Zealand television series
2010s New Zealand television series
2020s New Zealand television series
New Zealand television news shows
Three (TV channel) original programming
TVNZ 2 original programming
TVNZ 1 original programming